William Viner may refer to:
 William Litton Viner, organist and composer of church music
 William Samuel Viner, Australian chess master